The 1996–97 Ice Hockey Superleague season was the inaugural season of the Ice Hockey Superleague (ISL).

The league was formed by the owners of the Ayr Scottish Eagles, Basingstoke Bison, Bracknell Bees, Cardiff Devils, Manchester Storm, Newcastle Cobras, Nottingham Panthers and Sheffield Steelers. Ayr was the only new team with the rest of the teams having left the British Hockey League.

Benson & Hedges Cup
The Benson & Hedges Cup consists of the teams from the ISL and the top teams from the British Hockey League. Sixteen teams in total were split into four regional groups playing each team in their group at home and away. The top two teams of each group then progressed to the quarter finals where the teams were paired off and the winning team on aggregate (after playing home and away) progressed to the semi finals. Again the winning team on aggregate progressed to the one-off final game held at Sheffield Arena.

Group A

Group B

Group C

Group D

Quarter-finals

Ayr Scottish Eagles vs Manchester Storm
Manchester Storm 2-4 Ayr Scottish Eagles
Ayr Scottish Eagles 3-2 Manchester Storm (Ayr win 7-4 on aggregate)

Basingstoke Bison vs Bracknell Bees
Basingstoke Bison 5-3 Bracknell Bees
Bracknell Bees 5-6 Basingstoke Bison (Basingstoke win 11-8 on aggregate)

Cardiff Devils vs Nottingham Panthers
Nottingham Panthers 0-1 Cardiff Devils
Cardiff Devils 3-4 Nottingham Panthers (after penalty shots, Nottingham win 5-4 on aggregate)

Sheffield Steelers vs Newcastle Cobras
Newcastle Cobras 0-2 Sheffield Steelers
Sheffield Steelers 6-3 Newcastle Cobras (Sheffield win 8-3 on aggregate)

Semi-finals

Nottingham Panthers vs Sheffield Steelers
Sheffield Steelers 2-3 Nottingham Panthers
Nottingham Panthers 3-1 Sheffield Steelers (Nottingham win 6-3 on aggregate)

Basingstoke Bison vs Ayr Scottish Eagles
Ayr Scottish Eagles 0-2 Basingstoke Bison
Basingstoke Bison 4-9 Ayr Scottish Eagles (Ayr win 9-6 on aggregate)

Final
The final took place at Sheffield Arena between Ayr Scottish Eagles and Nottingham Panthers.

Ayr Scottish Eagles 3–5 Nottingham Panthers

League
Each team played three home games and three away games against each of their opponents. All eight teams were entered into the playoffs.

Playoffs
All eight teams in the league took part in the playoffs. Group A consisted of Ayr, Cardiff, Manchester and Newcastle while Group B consisted of Basingstoke, Bracknell, Nottingham and Sheffield. The top two teams from each playoff group qualified for the playoff weekend at NYNEX Arena.

Group A

Group B

Semi-finals
The finals weekend took place at NYNEX Arena in Manchester.

Winner A vs Runner-Up B
Cardiff Devils 2-5 Sheffield Steelers

Winner B vs Runner-Up A
Nottingham Panthers 6-5 Ayr Scottish Eagles (after overtime)

Final
Winner A vs Winner B
Sheffield Steelers 3-1 Nottingham Panthers

Awards
Coach of the Year Trophy – Jim Lynch, Ayr Scottish Eagles
Player of the Year Trophy – Stevie Lyle, Cardiff Devils
Alan Weeks Trophy – Jason Stone, Cardiff Devils

All Star team

Scoring leaders
Most points: 60 Dale Junkin (Bracknell Bees)
Most goals: 28 Paul Adey (Nottingham Panthers)
Most assists: 37 Vezio Sacratini (Cardiff Devils)
Most PIMs: 149 Frank Kovacs (Sheffield Steelers)

References
Ice Hockey Journalists UK
The Internet Hockey Database
Malcolm Preen's Ice Hockey Results and Tables

Ice Hockey Superleague seasons
1
United